Maurino is a rural locality (a village) in Spasskoye Rural Settlement, Vologodsky District, Vologda Oblast, Russia. The population was 2 as of 2002.

Geography 
The distance to Vologda is 28 km, to Nepotyagovo is 18 km. Petrovskoye is the nearest rural locality.

References 

Rural localities in Vologodsky District